Anemone parviflora, the northern anemone, or small-flowered anemone, is a herbaceous flowering plant species in the buttercup family Ranunculaceae. Plants grow 10 to 30 cm tall, from a thin, 2 mm thick rhizome.  Stem leaves without petioles, basal leaves few with long petioles and deeply three-parted. Plants flowering late spring to mid summer with the flowers composed of five or six sepals normally white or soft bluish colored, 8 to 13 mm long. The plants produce one peduncle with one solitary flower.  Fruits in heads ovoid in shape, 10 mm long or less, fruits densely woolly, not winged and with straight 1 to 2.5 mm long beaks.

Native to central and western North America mostly in Canada and Alaska but also south to Idaho and even into Utah where it is found growing on wet rocky ledges, meadows and along stream banks in normally calcareous soils.

References

parviflora
Flora of Subarctic America
Flora of Canada
Flora of the Northwestern United States
Flora of the Southwestern United States
Flora without expected TNC conservation status